Aleksi Salmenperä (born 1973 in Helsinki) is a Finnish film director.  He is a graduate of the University of Art and Design Helsinki; among his films are 2004's Producing Adults, 2007's A Man's Work and 2010 Bad Family. A Man's Work was entered into the 29th Moscow International Film Festival.

Filmography
Rajatapaus (1998)
Onnenpeli 2001 (short film, 2001)
Producing Adults (Finnish: Lapsia ja aikuisia) (2004)
A Man's Work (Finnish: Miehen työ) (2007)
Posse (short film, 2009)
Bad Family (Finnish: Paha perhe) (2010)
Alcan Highway (2013)
Häiriötekijä (2015)
Jättiläinen (2016)
Tyhjiö (2018)

References

External links

1973 births
Living people
Artists from Helsinki
Finnish film directors